Belski Vrh is a settlement in the Municipality of Zavrč in the Haloze area of eastern Slovenia. The area traditionally belonged to the Styria region. It is now included in the Drava Statistical Region.

The local church was destroyed by lightning in the 19th century. It was dedicated to Saint Urban and was a Late Gothic building. Some remains of the church and a nearby keep are still visible.

References

External links
Belski Vrh on Geopedia

Populated places in the Municipality of Zavrč